The Holstein–Primakoff transformation in quantum mechanics is a mapping to the spin operators from boson creation and annihilation operators, effectively truncating their infinite-dimensional Fock space to finite-dimensional subspaces.

One important aspect of quantum mechanics is the occurrence of—in general—non-commuting operators which represent observables, quantities that can be measured.
A standard example of a set of such operators are the three components of the angular momentum operators, which are crucial in many quantum systems.
These operators are complicated, and one would like to find a simpler representation, which can be used to generate approximate calculational schemes.

The transformation was developed in 1940 by Theodore Holstein, a graduate student at the time, and Henry Primakoff. This method has found widespread applicability and has been extended in many different directions. 

There is a close link to other methods of boson mapping of operator algebras: in particular, the (non-Hermitian) Dyson–Maleev technique, and to a lesser extent the Jordan–Schwinger map.  There is, furthermore,  a close link to the theory of (generalized) coherent states in Lie algebras.

The basic technique
The basic idea can be illustrated for the basic example of spin operators of quantum mechanics. 

In order to uniquely specify the states of a spin, one may diagonalise any set of commuting operators.
states with the quantum numbers ,

The projection quantum number  takes on all the values .

Consider a single particle of spin   (i.e., look at a single irreducible representation of SU(2)). Now take the state with maximal projection , the extremal weight state as a vacuum for a set of boson operators, and each subsequent state with lower projection quantum number as a boson excitation of the previous one,

Thus, the spin raising and lowering operators 
The precise relations between the operators must be chosen to ensure the correct commutation relations for the  spin operators, such that they act on a finite-dimensional space, unlike the original Fock space.

The resulting Holstein–Primakoff transformation can be written as

Alternatively to a Taylor expansion there has been recent progress     with a resummation of the series that made expressions possible that are polynomial in bosonic operators but still mathematically exact (on the physical subspace). The first method develops a resummation method  that is exact for the for spin  while the latter employs a Newton series (a finite difference) expansion with an identical result, as shown below

While the expression above is not exact for spins higher than 1/2 it is an improvement over the Taylor series. Exact expressions also exist for higher spins and include  terms. Much like the result above also for the expressions of higher spins  and therefore the resummation is hermitian. 

There also exists a non-Hermitian Dyson–Maleev variant realization J is related to the above and valid for all spins, 

satisfying the same commutation relations and characterized by the same Casimir invariant.

The technique can be further extended to the Witt algebra, which is the centerless Virasoro algebra.

See also
 Spin wave
 Jordan–Wigner transformation
 Jordan–Schwinger transformation
 Bogoliubov–Valatin transformation
 Klein transformation

References

Quantum mechanics